Reginald Windsor Sackville, 7th Earl De La Warr (21 February 1817 – 5 January 1896), styled The Honourable Reginald West until 1843, as The Honourable Reginald Sackville between 1843 and 1870 and known as the Lord Buckhurst between 1870 and 1873, was a British clergyman and landowner.

Background
Sackville was the third son of George Sackville-West, 5th Earl De La Warr, and Lady Elizabeth Sackville, Baroness Buckhurst in her own right, daughter and heiress of John Sackville, 3rd Duke of Dorset. He was the brother of George West, Viscount Cantelupe, Charles Sackville-West, 6th Earl De La Warr, Elizabeth Russell, Duchess of Bedford, Mortimer Sackville-West, 1st Baron Sackville, and Lionel Sackville-West, 2nd Baron Sackville. Born Reginald West, he assumed in 1843 by Royal licence the additional surname of Sackville, and in 1871 the surname of Sackville only.

Public life
Sackville was Rector of Withyam, Sussex, from 1841 to 1865 and Chaplain to the Queen from 1846 to 1865. He succeeded his mother as Baron Buckhurst in 1870 according to a special remainder in the letters patent (the intention was that the barony of Buckhurst should always be separate from the earldom of De La Warr). Three years later he succeeded in the earldom after his elder brother Charles committed suicide. His younger brother Mortimer then claimed the barony of Buckhurst. However, Mortimer's claim was rejected by the House of Lords. Lord De La Warr was an active member of the House of Lords. From 1871 to 1895 he was High Steward of Stratford-upon-Avon.

Family
Lord De La Warr married Constance Mary Elizabeth Baillie-Cochrane, daughter of Alexander Baillie-Cochrane, 1st Baron Lamington, in 1867. They had several children, including Lady Edeline Sackville, wife of Lord Strickland. His eldest son Lionel Charles Cranfield Sackville, Viscount Cantelupe (1868–1890), predeceased him. Lord De La Warr died in January 1896, aged 78, and was succeeded in the earldom by his only surviving son, Gilbert. The Countess De la Warr married as her second husband Reverend Paul Williams Wyatt in 1902. She died in July 1929, aged 83.

References

External links

1817 births
1896 deaths
7
2
Reginald
Younger sons of barons